Jongensfontein (also Groot-Jongensfontein) is a coastal settlement in the Garden Route District Municipality in the Western Cape province of South Africa.

References

Populated places in the Hessequa Local Municipality